Povardarie is a geographic region in the central part of North Macedonia, and includes all of the canyons, mountains and valleys through which the river Vardar flows. 

Term is used in names of Diocese of Povardarie of the Macedonian Orthodox Church and "Eparchy of Veles and Povardarie" of the Orthodox Ohrid Archbishopric.

Geography of North Macedonia